Iniyengilum is a 1983 Indian Malayalam-language social problem film directed by I. V. Sasi, written by T. Damodaran and produced by N. G. John. It stars Mohanlal, Ratheesh, Lalu Alex, Ranipadmini, Seema, and Mammootty. The film features music composed by Shyam. The film juxtaposes the economic and cultural conditions of Kerala and Japan.

The film tells the story of a young idealist, Ravi (Mohanlal), who is nauseated by the hypocrisy of his politician brother (Mammootty). To hit back at the prevailing corrupt political system, Ravi stages cultural shows under the banner of the Darshana Kala Kendra, which is a group of unemployed youth. Iniyengilum was a commercial success at the box office.

Plot

Cast

Mohanlal as Ravi
Ratheesh as Ashokan
Lalu Alex as Alex Mathew
Ranipadmini as Lekha
Seema as Geetha
Mammootty as Diwakaran
T. G. Ravi as Madhavan
Raveendran as Pradeep
Vincent (actor) as Avarachan
Adoor Bhasi as Mathayi
Kottayam Santha
Sankaradi
Sreenivasan
Captain Raju as Prasad
Balan K. Nair as Nambiar
C. I. Paul
Kunjandi

Production
The film was shot in Japan and Hong Kong, and some parts in Kerala.

Soundtrack
The music was composed by Shyam and the lyrics were written by Yusufali Kechery.

Release and reception 
The film was released on 20 August 1983. Writing for India Today, Sreedhar Pillai called it "a badly made film" which "offers nothing new". The film was a commercial success.

References

External links 
 

1980s Malayalam-language films
1983 films
Films directed by I. V. Sasi
Films with screenplays by T. Damodaran